Matthew Ollen Insell (born September 22, 1982) is the current Associate Head Coach of Women's Basketball at Middle Tennessee State University.  Insell was the head coach of the Ole Miss women's basketball team from 2013 to 2018  before he was let go by Ole Miss following the 2018 season. Prior to his time at Ole Miss, Insell spent 5 years as an Assistant Coach at the University of Kentucky and one year as the Director of Basketball Operations at Louisiana Tech University. On May 7, 2018 Matt Insell was hired to work as assistant coach at Middle Tennessee State University. September 20, 2022, Matt Insell was promoted to Associate Head Coach at Middle Tennessee State University.

Insell has been a part of ten teams that have participated in postseason play. Four of his teams at Kentucky advanced to the NCAA Tournament with three reaching the Elite Eight and another falling in the second round. In 2020-2021 Middle Tennessee State advanced to the NCAA tournament. Insell has also participated in the WNIT five times, once with Kentucky, twice with Ole Miss and twice at Middle Tennessee, including advancing to the final four in 2022.

Before career 
Before his time at Kentucky, Insell was the director of basketball operations at Louisiana Tech under head coach Chris Long. He landed at Louisiana Tech following an extremely successful career as one of the top AAU coaches in the country, leading the Tennessee Flight—a Nike Elite travel program. Insell made a national name for himself when 41 of his former AAU players went on to play Division I basketball, including former Wildcats Victoria Dunlap and Crystal Riley. He also coached the Shelbyville Sports Shop 15-Under team to the AAU National Championship title in 2004.

Insell earned valuable basketball experience while attending the University of Tennessee from 2001-05. He worked closely with both the men's and women's basketball programs, serving as a student assistant and video coordinator under former men's head coach Buzz Peterson and as an instructor at Pat Summitt's summer basketball camps. The Shelbyville, Tenn., native transferred to Middle Tennessee State during the 2005-06 season.

Career 
Prior to his time leading the Rebels, Insell spent five years as an assistant coach for a very successful Kentucky Wildcat team under head coach Matthew Mitchell. While there, UK recorded four 20-win seasons and four trips to the NCAA Tournament—ending each of the last three seasons he spent in Lexington ranked in the top-25.

Insell, who was responsible for the guards while also having recruiting and player development duties, served as the top assistant coach and helped UK ink three top-10 recruiting classes and seven McDonald's All-Americans. During his time at Kentucky, Insell helped develop guard A'dia Mathies, a two-time SEC Player of the Year and All-America candidate, and Bria Goss who was named SEC Freshman of the Year.

During his time at Ole Miss, Insell led the program to four top-25 wins and two 17-plus win seasons amidst the intense strength of schedule in the SEC. He was named the eighth head women’s basketball coach in Ole Miss history (3/28/13), following five seasons as an assistant on Matthew Mitchell’s staff at Kentucky.

Insell led Ole Miss to two national postseason tournaments where they competed in the WNIT. Ole Miss opened its brand-new arena, The Pavilion at Ole Miss, with 12-straight home wins—the most home since the late 1980s when Ole Miss won 15 straight. Ole Miss also set a new attendance record for the third straight year with 8,088 fans in attendance to see the Rebels earn their 800th win in program history over Jackson State.

Insell guided Ole Miss to some significant wins during his time in Oxford, Miss., knocking off eventual Elite Eight school and 25th-ranked Oregon at home, 83-67—marking the third-straight season with a top-25 win under Insell. The Rebels also ended a pair of long losing streaks during the year, breaking a 28-game losing streak that dated back to 1996 against Tennessee (67-62), as well as picking up the first win over Texas A&M since 1997 on Senior Night with a 62-49 victory.

Insell led a young team in 2015-16 with just two seniors and only two returnees that had been in the program for more than two seasons, but the Rebels still produced some exciting moments on the court.? For the second consecutive season, the Rebels knocked off a ranked foe with a 67-59 victory over No. 9 Kentucky.The win was the first over a top-10 school for Ole Miss since 2010, when the Rebels took down No. 8 Georgia (66-65).

In just his second year at Ole Miss, Insell took the Rebels to new heights in 2014-15 with 19 wins and seven victories in SEC play, the most overall wins since the 2009-10 season. The Rebels also returned to the postseason with a third-round foray into the WNIT.

The Rebels, who improved seven wins in 2014-15, posted four wins over NCAA Tournament participants, and, after being picked to finish last in the SEC preseason coaches and media poll, closed the season tied for No. 7 in the league standings. Ole Miss garnered the No. 8 seed for the SEC Tournament—the highest seed for the Rebels in five seasons.

In 2014-15, Insell and the Rebels knocked off ranked foes in No. 13 Kentucky and No. 18 Georgia—the first time in five years Ole Miss had defeated a ranked foe. The season also saw Ole Miss pick up its 400th win at Tad Smith Coliseum. One of the high points of the season was when Insell and his father, Rick, made women's basketball history by becoming the first father-son duo to play against each other in NCAA women's basketball when Middle Tennessee made the trip to Oxford in November. Insell laid the foundation for the Rebels during his first season in 2013-14, leading Ole Miss to a 10-6 non-conference record and a seven-game winning streak—the longest streak for the Rebels since the 2007-08 season.

After battling through the always-challenging SEC schedule, the Rebels entered the SEC Tournament as the No. 14 seed, determined to take the momentum from a regular season finale victory over Auburn into the postseason tournament. Drawing the No. 11 seed Arkansas, the Rebels took care of business with a 63-62 victory, giving Ole Miss a statement win for Insell. He also led the Rebels to wins over instate rival, Mississippi State, to give the first-year head coach his first SEC victory.

Personal life 
Insell is married to the former Autumn Clark, they have 2 children, a son Clark and daughter Evie.

Head coaching record

References

1982 births
Living people
American women's basketball coaches
Basketball coaches from Tennessee
Kentucky Wildcats women's basketball coaches
Louisiana Tech Lady Techsters basketball coaches
Middle Tennessee Blue Raiders women's basketball coaches
Middle Tennessee State University alumni
Ole Miss Rebels women's basketball coaches
People from Shelbyville, Tennessee
University of Tennessee alumni